Justin Roiland's Solo Vanity Card Productions! is an American animation studio founded by animator and voice actor Justin Roiland. The studio is best known for producing Rick and Morty for Adult Swim as well as Solar Opposites and Koala Man for Hulu and Disney+ internationally before Roiland's dismissal from all three shows in January 2023.

Productions

Television series

Specials

References

Adult animation studios
American companies established in 2007
Mass media companies established in 2007
Entertainment companies established in 2007
Mass media companies disestablished in 2023
Entertainment companies disestablished in 2023
Companies based in Los Angeles
2007 establishments in California
2023 disestablishments in California